Hasići is a village in the municipalities of Ribnik, Republika Srpska and Ključ, Bosnia and Herzegovina .

Demographics 
According to the 2013 census, its population was 234, all Bosniaks living in Ključ and none in the Ribnik part.

References

Populated places in Ključ
Populated places in Ribnik